Milford Township is a township in Geary County, Kansas, USA.  As of the 2000 census, its population was 1,583.

Geography
According to the USGS, it contains three cemeteries: Barry, Branscom and Milford.

The streams of Dixon Creek, Farnum Creek, Madison Creek and Rush Creek run through this township.

References
 USGS Geographic Names Information System (GNIS)

Further reading

External links

 City-Data.com

Townships in Geary County, Kansas
Townships in Kansas